KIKL (90.9 MHz) is a Christian contemporary station licensed to Lafayette, Louisiana. It is owned by Educational Media Foundation and airs its K-Love network.

History
The station began broadcasting February 7, 1988, and held the call sign KSJY. It was owned by Lafayette Educational Broadcasting Foundation and aired a religious format. In 1997, the station was sold to American Family Association for $175,000, and it became an affiliate of American Family Radio.

In 2005, the station was sold to Educational Media Foundation for $1.5 million. On March 29, 2005, its call sign was changed to KAQE and on April 6, 2005, its call sign was changed to KIKL. The station became an affiliate of K-Love.

References

External links

IKL
K-Love radio stations
Radio stations established in 1988
1988 establishments in Louisiana
Educational Media Foundation radio stations
Christian radio stations in Louisiana